Telecom Tower refers to one of several telecommunications towers:
Black Mountain Tower in Canberra (formerly Telecom Tower)
BT Tower (Birmingham)
BT Tower in London